Veikko Ilmari Pakarinen (12 September 1910 in Vyborg – 6 December 1987 in Gold Coast, Queensland) was a Finnish gymnast who competed in the 1932 Summer Olympics and in the 1936 Summer Olympics.

References

1910 births
1987 deaths
Finnish male artistic gymnasts
Olympic gymnasts of Finland
Gymnasts at the 1932 Summer Olympics
Gymnasts at the 1936 Summer Olympics
Olympic bronze medalists for Finland
Olympic medalists in gymnastics
Medalists at the 1936 Summer Olympics
Medalists at the 1932 Summer Olympics